Wawira Njiru, is a Kenyan entrepreneur, nutritionist, and philanthropist, who serves as the executive director of Food for Education, an organization that serves a hot, nutritious and affordable school meal to over 33,000 public primary school children in the urban and peri-urban areas of Kiambu, Nairobiand Mombasacounties.

Background and Education
She grew up in the town of Ruiru, in Kiambu County, immediately northwest of the capital city of Nairobi. She attended local schools for her primary and secondary education. In 2010, she was admitted to the University of South Australia, in Adelaide, where she graduated with a Bachelor of Nutrition Science degree.

Career
In 2012, while pursuing her undergraduate degree at the University of South Australia, Njiru hosted a Kenyan-themed fundraising dinner where she invited 80 guests, charged them $20 per plate and managed to raise the equivalent of Ksh. 126,000. 

With these funds, Food for Education was founded. She set-up a makeshift kitchen in Ruiru Primary School whose outreach was to an initial 25 children. This was followed by several internet fundraising campaigns. Over time, the number of children in the program increased. 

According to Njiru, it costs Ksh30 (approx. US$0.30) to provide a meal to a primary-going school child in Kenya. The parents or guardians are asked to contribute KSh15 (approx. US$0.15). Food for Education provides a subsidy to cater for the remaining cost.

The organisation uses a hub-and-spoke system whereby meals are prepared in central kitchens (hub) and distributed through systematised logistics to schools (spoke). Their technology-centered approach allows parents to pay $0.15/meal via mobile money and primary school students with their NFC smartwatches connected to a virtual wallet allows them to 'tap to eat' in under 5 seconds.

Awards and recognition
In 2018, Business Daily Africa, a Kenyan daily named her one of the Top 40 Under 40 Kenyan Women for the year 2018. In December 2018, she became the first person to win the Global Citizen Prize for Youth Leadership. In 2018, Wawira was also named among the 100 Most Influential Young Kenyans, by Avance Media. Much recently, in October 2021, Ms. Njiru was recognised as the UN Person of the Year .

See also
 Esther Muchemi
 Sylvia Mulinge

References

External links

Website of Food 4 Education Organisation

1991 births
Living people
Kikuyu people
21st-century Kenyan businesswomen
21st-century Kenyan businesspeople
People from Nairobi
University of South Australia alumni
Kenyan chief executives